(also called  in Nihon Shoki) is an island on the south-west tip of Honshu, Japan.

Geography
The island is irregularly shaped and hilly. The parts of sprawling city of Shimonoseki occupy the most of the island, making it the most populous minor island in Yamaguchi Prefecture, albeit only sixth in size by area.

Transportation
The island is connected to the Japanese mainland of Honshu by three bridges, one above ship lock. Kanmon Railway Tunnel connects island to Kyushu, but San'yō Main Line has no stop-overs on island, nearby station being the Shimonoseki Station in the downtown area. Also, bridge connection exist to the small  on the north-western tip of the Hikoshima.

History
The island was inhabited since prehistory, as evidenced by petroglyphs found in 1918. Following the Battle of Dan-no-ura, the refugees from the Taira clan has migrated to island and set the basis for the local agriculture. The island was an important site of Shimonoseki Campaign in 1863-1864 when it was much feared the island would become the Japanese variant of Hong Kong. The island industrialization began in 1924 with the building of ammonium sulphate plant with German license in 1924. Currently island is heavily populated and industrialized, including shipyard and titanium&zinc smelter.

Attractions
Fossil-rich cliffs

Notable residents
Michiyo Kogure - film actress
Shinji Yamashita - actor
Atsushi Tamura - comedian
Shinobu Otowa - enka singer
Hideo Fujimoto - baseball pitcher
Masashi Nishiyama - judoka

See also
 List of islands of Japan by area
 List of islands by population density
 Shimonoseki

References

External links
Hikoshima official site

Islands of Yamaguchi Prefecture
Islands of the East China Sea